The first world record in the women's 4 x 100 metres relay was recognised by the International Association of Athletics Federations in 1922.
45 world records have been ratified by the IAAF in the event. The following table shows the world record progression in the women's 4 × 100 metre relay, as ratified by the IAAF. "y" denotes time for 4 × 110 yards (402.34 m), ratified as a record for this event.

Records 1922-1976

Records since 1977

From 1975, the IAAF accepted separate automatically electronically timed records for events up to 400 metres. From 1977, the IAAF required fully automatic timing to the hundredth of a second for these events.

References

4x100, women
4 × 100 metres relay